Saluda Factory Historic District is a national historic district located at West Columbia, Lexington County, South Carolina. It encompasses three contributing sites associated with the development of the area along the Saluda River; Saluda Factory, Camp Sorghum and old State Road.  The Saluda Factory ruins consist of the granite foundation and sluices from a textile mill that operated on the river between the years 1834 and 1884. The Camp Sorghum site was the site of a Confederate prison camp. It held 1,300 Union soldiers, who were confined there from the autumn of 1864 to February 1865, and subsequently transferred to Charlotte, North Carolina. The old State Road, originally the Cherokee Path, bounded Saluda Factory and Camp Sorghum on the east.

It was listed on the National Register of Historic Places in 1973.

References 

Archaeological sites on the National Register of Historic Places in South Carolina
Historic districts on the National Register of Historic Places in South Carolina
Buildings and structures in Lexington County, South Carolina
National Register of Historic Places in Lexington County, South Carolina